The  Spain lunar sample displays  are two commemorative plaques consisting of tiny fragments of Moon specimens brought back with the Apollo 11 and Apollo 17 lunar missions. These plaques were given to the people of Spain by United States President Richard Nixon as goodwill gifts.

Description

Apollo 11

Apollo 17

History 

The whereabouts of the Spanish Apollo 11 lunar sample are unknown.

Spanish newspaper El Mundo reported on July 20, 2009, that Franco's grandson, Francisco Franco Martinez Bordiú, claimed the Spanish Apollo 11 lunar sample was gifted to his grandfather personally. It was kept at El Pardo Palace in Franco's office. He said his mother lost the display after Franco's death. 

The Apollo 17 commemorative plaque is on display at the Naval Museum in Madrid. Henry Kissinger, Secretary of State during the Nixon administration, gave the Apollo 17 lunar samples to Luis Carrero Blanco and the family eventually donated it to the museum.

See also
 List of Apollo lunar sample displays

References

Further reading 
  See *The Case of the Missing Moon Rocks.

External links
 Partial list of Apollo  11, 12, 14, 15, 16, and 17 sample locations, NASA Johnson Space Center

Stolen and missing moon rocks
Collections of the Naval Museum of Madrid
Unexplained disappearances
Spain–United States relations
Francisco Franco